Martina Nedelková (born 21 October 1977) is a former professional Slovak tennis player. On 7 October 1996, she reached her highest WTA singles ranking of 441.

Personal life
Martina was born on 21 October 1977 in Piešťany. Nedelková started playing tennis in Piešťany with coach Ivo Doležálek. Martina currently lives in the USA, where she remained after successful studies and works as a tennis coach.

Career
Nedelková had a successful junior career,  Her career-high world ranking as a junior was world No. 1. In 1994 Nedelková won a prestigious tournaments for juniors Osaka Mayor's Cup and Trofeo Bonfiglio (Grade A) She has won six doubles titles on the ITF Women's Circuit.

She decided to follow the college route and was part of the VCU Rams tennis team from 1998 to 2001.

ITF junior results

Singles (1–3)

Doubles (7–2)

References

External links
 
 

1997 births
Living people
Slovak female tennis players
VCU Rams athletes
Slovak expatriate sportspeople in the United States
Sportspeople from Piešťany
College women's tennis players in the United States